Rafael Diniz Alves e Silva (born 21 June 1992), commonly known as Rafinha, is a Brazilian footballer who plays for EC Vitória as an attacking midfielder.

Club career
Born in Alumínio, São Paulo, Rafinha graduated with Audax's youth setup, after a period on loan at F.C. Porto. He made his senior debuts in 2011, appearing regularly.

On 16 May 2013 Rafinha joined Ponte Preta, in Série A. He made his debut for the club on 9 June, coming on as a late substitute for Chiquinho in a 0–2 home loss against Botafogo.

After appearing rarely for Ponte, Rafinha moved to Guaratinguetá in September 2013. In January 2014 he returned to Audax, with the side now in the main category of Campeonato Paulista.

After a loan stint back at Guará, Rafinha returned to his parent club in December 2014. On 6 March 2015 he signed a three-year deal with Atlético Paranaense.

In July 2015, Rafinha joined ABC Futebol Clube in Campeonato Brasileiro Série B.

References

External links

1992 births
Living people
Footballers from São Paulo (state)
Brazilian footballers
Association football midfielders
Campeonato Brasileiro Série A players
Campeonato Brasileiro Série B players
Associação Atlética Ponte Preta players
Grêmio Osasco Audax Esporte Clube players
Guaratinguetá Futebol players
Club Athletico Paranaense players
ABC Futebol Clube players
Associação Ferroviária de Esportes players
Ceará Sporting Club players
Chiapas F.C. footballers
Grêmio Esportivo Brasil players
Goiás Esporte Clube players
Botafogo Futebol Clube (SP) players